Zhang Jian (born 28 February 1989) is a Chinese footballer who currently plays for Shanxi Longjin in the China League Two.

Club career
Zhang Jian started his professional football career in 2006 when he joined Chongqing Lifan for the 2006 Chinese Super League campaign.  

On 15 December 2011, Zhang transferred to Chinese Super League side Beijing Guoan. In July 2013, Zhang was loaned to China League Two side Hebei Zhongji until 31 December 2013.

On 16 July 2015, Zhang transferred to China League One side Wuhan Zall.

On 22 January 2016, Zhang transferred to fellow China League One side Dalian Transcendence.

Career statistics 
Statistics accurate as of match played 31 December 2020.

References

External links
 

1989 births
Living people
Chinese footballers
Footballers from Shanxi
Chongqing Liangjiang Athletic F.C. players
Beijing Guoan F.C. players
Hebei F.C. players
Wuhan F.C. players
Dalian Transcendence F.C. players
Jiangxi Beidamen F.C. players
Chinese Super League players
China League One players
China League Two players
Footballers at the 2010 Asian Games
Association football midfielders
Asian Games competitors for China